Transact-SQL (T-SQL) is Microsoft's and Sybase's proprietary extension to the SQL (Structured Query Language) used to interact with relational databases. T-SQL expands on the SQL standard to include procedural programming, local variables, various support functions for string processing, date processing, mathematics, etc. and changes to the DELETE and UPDATE statements.

Transact-SQL is central to using Microsoft SQL Server. All applications that communicate with an instance of SQL Server do so by sending Transact-SQL statements to the server, regardless of the user interface of the application.

Stored procedures in SQL Server are executable server-side routines. The advantage of stored procedures is the ability to pass parameters.

Variables
Transact-SQL provides the following statements to declare and set local variables: DECLARE, SET and SELECT.
DECLARE @var1 NVARCHAR(30);
SET @var1 = 'Some Name';
SELECT @var1 = Name
  FROM Sales.Store
  WHERE CustomerID = 100;

Flow control
Keywords for flow control in Transact-SQL include BEGIN and END, BREAK, CONTINUE, GOTO, IF and ELSE, RETURN, WAITFOR, and WHILE.

IF and ELSE allow conditional execution. This batch statement will print "It is the weekend" if the current date is a weekend day, or "It is a weekday" if the current date is a weekday.  (Note: This code assumes that Sunday is configured as the first day of the week in the @@DATEFIRST setting.)

IF DATEPART(dw, GETDATE()) = 7 OR DATEPART(dw, GETDATE()) = 1
   PRINT 'It is the weekend.';
ELSE
   PRINT 'It is a weekday.';

BEGIN and END mark a block of statements. If more than one statement is to be controlled by the conditional in the example above, we can use BEGIN and END like this:

IF DATEPART(dw, GETDATE()) = 7 OR DATEPART(dw, GETDATE()) = 1
BEGIN
   PRINT 'It is the weekend.';
   PRINT 'Get some rest on the weekend!';
END;
ELSE
BEGIN
   PRINT 'It is a weekday.';
   PRINT 'Get to work on a weekday!';
END;

WAITFOR will wait for a given amount of time, or until a particular time of day. The statement can be used for delays or to block execution until the set time.

RETURN is used to immediately return from a stored procedure or function.

BREAK ends the enclosing WHILE loop, while CONTINUE causes the next iteration of the loop to execute. An example of a WHILE loop is given below.

DECLARE @i INT;
SET @i = 0;

WHILE @i < 5
BEGIN
   PRINT 'Hello world.';
   SET @i = @i + 1;
END;

Changes to DELETE and UPDATE statements
In Transact-SQL, both the DELETE and UPDATE statements are enhanced to enable data from another table to be used in the operation, without needing a subquery:
 DELETE accepts joined tables in the FROM clause, similarly to SELECT.  When this is done, the name or alias of which table in the join is to be deleted from is placed between DELETE and FROM.
 UPDATE allows a FROM clause to be added.  The table to be updated can be either joined in the FROM clause and referenced by alias, or referenced only at the start of the statement as per standard SQL.

This example deletes all users who have been flagged with the 'Idle' flag.
DELETE u
  FROM users AS u
  INNER JOIN user_flags AS f
    ON u.id = f.id
    WHERE f.name = 'idle';

BULK INSERT
BULK is a Transact-SQL statement that implements a bulk data-loading process, inserting multiple rows into a table, reading data from an external sequential file. Use of BULK INSERT results in better performance than processes that issue individual INSERT statements for each row to be added. Additional details are available in MSDN.

TRY CATCH
Beginning with SQL Server 2005, Microsoft introduced additional TRY CATCH logic to support exception type behaviour.  This behaviour enables developers to simplify their code and leave out @@ERROR checking after each SQL execution statement.

-- begin transaction
BEGIN TRAN;

BEGIN TRY
   -- execute each statement
   INSERT INTO MYTABLE(NAME) VALUES ('ABC');
   INSERT INTO MYTABLE(NAME) VALUES ('123');

   -- commit the transaction
   COMMIT TRAN;
END TRY
BEGIN CATCH
   -- roll back the transaction because of error
   ROLLBACK TRAN;
END CATCH;

See also
Adaptive Server Enterprise (Sybase)
PL/SQL (Oracle)
PL/pgSQL (PostgreSQL)
SQL/PSM (ISO standard)
Tabular Data Stream

References

External links
 Transact-SQL Reference
 Transact-SQL Tutorial

SQL
Data-centric programming languages